Conulinus is a genus of gastropods belonging to the family Cerastidae.

The species of this genus are found in Africa.

Species:

Conulinus carpenteri 
Conulinus daubenbergeri 
Conulinus macroconus 
Conulinus mfwanganensis 
Conulinus rutshuruensis 
Conulinus tener 
Conulinus ugandae 
Conulinus verdcourti

References

Gastropods